Madhusudhan Reddy Takkala (born 14 January 1946) is a member of the 14th Lok Sabha of India. He represents the Adilabad constituency of Andhra Pradesh and is a member of the Telangana Rashtra Samithi (TRS) political party.

External links
 Home Page on the Parliament of India's Website

1946 births
Living people
People from Adilabad
India MPs 2004–2009
Lok Sabha members from Andhra Pradesh
Telugu politicians
Telangana Rashtra Samithi politicians